The 1964 Tasmanian state election was held on 2 May 1964  in the Australian state of Tasmania to elect 35 members of the Tasmanian House of Assembly. The election used the Hare-Clark proportional representation system — seven members were elected from each of five electorates.

The Labor Party, in power since 1934, was seeking a tenth term in office, and Premier Eric Reece was contesting his second election in that role, this time against Leader of the Opposition Angus Bethune of the Liberal Party. Despite its longevity, the peculiarities of the Tasmanian Hare-Clark system meant it had served as a minority government with the support of independents since the 1946 election.

This is to date the last time that a sitting Premier, in Reece, has won back to back elections and was the first and only time that a Tasmanian Government won a tenth consecutive term in office.

Results

Labor won a majority in the House of Assembly with 19 of the 35 seats. Dr Reg Turnbull, the former Labor treasurer who had won 27.9% as an independent in Bass in 1959 (equal to 5.64% of the statewide vote) departed in 1961 for the Australian Senate, with most of his vote returning to his former party.

|}

Distribution of votes

Primary vote by division

Distribution of seats

See also
 Members of the Tasmanian House of Assembly, 1964–1969
 Candidates of the 1964 Tasmanian state election

References

External links
Assembly Election Results, 1964, Parliament of Tasmania.
Report on Parliamentary Elections, 1964, Tasmanian Electoral Commission.

Elections in Tasmania
1964 elections in Australia
1960s in Tasmania
May 1964 events in Australia